Juchique de Ferrer is a Municipality in Veracruz, Mexico. It is located in central zone of the State of Veracruz, about 259.10 km from state capital Xalapa. It has a surface of 934.20 km2.

The municipality of Juchique de Ferrer is delimited to the north by Colipa to the east by Vega de Alatorre,  to the south-east by Alto Lucero, to the south by Tepetlán, to the north-west by Yecuatla and to the south-west by Chiconquiaco.

It produces principally maize, beans, coffee and green chile.

In Juchique de Ferrer, in March takes place the celebration in honor to San José Patron of the town.

The weather in Juchique de Ferrer  is warm all year with rains in summer and autumn.

References

External links 

  Municipal Official webpage
  Municipal Official Information

Municipalities of Veracruz